Horní Lhota may refer to places in the Czech Republic:

Dolní Lhota (Ostrava-City District), a municipality and village in the Moravian-Silesian Region
Dolní Lhota (Zlín District), a municipality and village in the Zlín Region